Hemiglyptus is a genus of flea beetles in the family Chrysomelidae. There were originally 5 described species (one from the Nearctic and 4 from Chile), but the latter have been moved to the genus Psilapha, so the sole member of the genus at present is Hemiglyptus basalis.

References

Alticini
Monotypic Chrysomelidae genera
Articles created by Qbugbot
Taxa named by George Henry Horn